Danijel Krivić (born 17 September 1980) is a Bosnian-Herzegovinian retired football defender.

International career
He made his debut for Bosnia and Herzegovina in an August 2002 friendly match against Serbia and Montenegro. It remained his sole international appearance.

References

External links
 
 

1980 births
Living people
People from Livno
Association football fullbacks
Bosnia and Herzegovina footballers
Bosnia and Herzegovina international footballers
NK Brotnjo players
Győri ETO FC players
NK Zadar players
NK Međimurje players
NK Široki Brijeg players
R.A.E.C. Mons players
NK Troglav 1918 Livno players
Premier League of Bosnia and Herzegovina players
Croatian Football League players
Belgian Pro League players
First League of the Federation of Bosnia and Herzegovina players
Bosnia and Herzegovina expatriate footballers
Expatriate footballers in Hungary
Bosnia and Herzegovina expatriate sportspeople in Hungary
Expatriate footballers in Croatia
Bosnia and Herzegovina expatriate sportspeople in Croatia
Expatriate footballers in Belgium
Bosnia and Herzegovina expatriate sportspeople in Belgium
NK Troglav 1918 Livno managers